Tical is the debut studio album by American rapper and Wu-Tang Clan member Method Man. It was released November 15, 1994, by Def Jam Recordings. It was the first Wu-Tang solo album released after the group's debut, Enter the Wu-Tang (36 Chambers). Similar to all first generation solo Wu-Tang projects, Tical was mainly produced by group member RZA, who provided a dark, murky and rugged sound. The album features guest appearances from RZA, Raekwon, Inspectah Deck, as well as several affiliates, who would later appear on future group projects. On October 5, 2017, Method Man revealed on the Viceland talk show Desus & Mero that the album's title is an acronym for "taking into consideration all lives."

Tical was a critical and commercial success, reaching number four on the US Billboard 200, and number one on the Top R&B/Hip Hop Albums. On January 18, 1995, the album was certified gold by the Recording Industry Association of America (RIAA), and on July 13, 1995, the record was certified platinum for the shipment of one million copies in the United States. The success for the album was driven by two singles: "Bring the Pain" and "I'll Be There for You / You're All I Need to Get By".

Background
In 1991, rapper GZA assisted Method Man in shopping him to label executives at Cold Chillin' Records. Though this would turn out to be unsuccessful, he formed the Wu-Tang Clan with his cousins RZA and Ol' Dirty Bastard, and Method Man was included in the group. Method Man went on to perform on eight of the twelve tracks on the group's acclaimed 1993 debut album, Enter the Wu-Tang (36 Chambers), and even had a solo song entitled "Method Man". That song as well as "C.R.E.A.M.", on which he performed the chorus line, reached #69 and #60 respectively on the Billboard Hot 100. These two songs had higher chart positions than any other tracks on the album, and thus caused much anticipation for Method Man's solo career. At the time of Wu-Tang Clan's debut album, Method Man's rhymes, charisma, and smooth, deep voice made him the group's most visible, popular member.

With the exception of "Sub Crazy" and "P.L.O. Style", which were co-produced by 4th Disciple and Method Man respectively, group member RZA produced Tical in its entirety – leading Jason Birchmeier of Allmusic to refer to the album as "a two-man show". As with the rest of the first round of Wu-Tang albums, RZA would recreate the distinct "Shaolin" sound while tailoring it to the featured rapper. On Tical, his production was especially gritty, dark and murky, complementing both Method Man's distinctly smooth-yet-rugged voice and his raps of cannabis smoking, project love, and traditional hardcore hip hop lyricism. During this time period of the Wu-Tang Clan, RZA was the sole provider of beats for all of its members, whom he would then have battle over the rights to record over them. This competitive approach to quality control would result in Tical'''s "Meth vs. Chef", a recorded battle between Method Man and Raekwon. "Meth vs. Chef" was recorded in 1993 before RZA's 36 Chambers Studios was flooded, destroying reportedly fifteen beats per Wu-Tang Clan rapper. Many of the beats for Tical would be hastily recreated, and mixed.

Singles
In 1994 the lead single "Bring the Pain" (backed with "P.L.O. Style") was released. "Bring the Pain" was a RZA-produced track with an understated but funky groove, capped with the ragga vocals of Booster. The single would reach number 45 on the Billboard Hot 100, and number 1 on the Hot Dance chart. The follow-up single, 1995's "Release Yo' Delf", was a more upbeat track, and featured Wu-affiliate Blue Raspberry singing an interpolation  of Gloria Gaynor's disco anthem, "I Will Survive". "Release Yo' Delf" reached number 98 on the Hot 100, failing to match the success of "Bring The Pain", but fared better in the UK, peaking at number 45 on the Official Singles Chart. Tical remains the only Method Man album with two singles reaching the Billboard Hot 100.

To continue the album's promotion, "All I Need" was remixed and released as a single in the summer of 1995 as "I'll Be There for You/You're All I Need to Get By". There are two remixes of this song: "Razor Sharp Mix" by the RZA, and the remix by Puff Daddy, both featuring Mary J. Blige.  RZA's version proved to be more successful, with its accompanying music video aiding the song to reach number 3 on the Billboard Hot 100, and number one on the Hot Rap, Dance and R&B charts. "Razor Sharp Mix" also won the two a Grammy Award for Best Rap Performance by a Duo or Group in 1996.

Critical reception
Initial reactionTical was well received by most music critics. Tracy E. Hopkins from Entertainment Weekly stated "Method Man proves to be one of rap's most formidable players. On his solo outing, Tical, the Wu-Tang Clan's standout MC wages lyrical warfare. His gripping rhymes creep out of the darkness and take listeners hostage". Melody Maker wrote "Meth comes correct with this beamed-down-from-Planet-Mars making music that's way darker and more disorienting than was previously thought possible". NME commented "The East coast hip hop renaissance continues apace... supremely laid-back, mooching along at a bass-weighted amble, whether it's framing the monogamous lover's lament of "All I Need" or the 'I Will Survive' hook of "Release Yo Self".Rolling Stone praised the album's singles, but stated "It's with its heaviest numbers that Tical delivers the primo goods". Writing for The Source, Mitchell Pierce described the album's production as "dark bass and distorted wails that sound like someone is being hacked to death". Pierce concluded "Tical combines verbal terrorism, tenebrous grooves and home-demo lunacy to produce a gritty production". Michael A. Gonzales from Vibe magazine described Tical as "Incredible", and further stated "The production wizardry and vocal complexity build with each listen."

Retrospect
Although Tical failed to achieve the critical success of several other Wu-Tang solo albums of its era, such as Only Built 4 Cuban Linx... and Liquid Swords, it has acquired a fair amount of acclaim over the years from various music writers and publications. In 1996, Select magazine ranked it number 28 on their 100 Best Albums of the 90s list, and in 1999, Ego Trip ranked it number 12 on their list of greatest hip-hop albums released in 1994.

In a later review for Tical, Jason Birchmeier from AllMusic praised Method Man's charisma and RZA's production and stated "Tical strictly spotlights the group's two stars and does so with refreshingly straightforward flair. There's none of the epic overreaching that mars so many rap albums of the era; rather, there's just over a dozen tracks here, and they're filled to the brim with rhymes and beats and little else; no pop-crossover concessions, nor any heady experimentation for the sake of experimentation. Just good ol'-fashioned hip-hop, albeit with a dark, deranged twist". In 2005, Robert Dimery included Tical on his list of 1001 Albums You Must Hear Before You Die, and in 2008, Tom Moon included it on his 1000 Recordings to Hear Before You Die list.

Accolades
The information regarding accolades is adapted from acclaimedmusic.net,except for lists with additional sources.
 (*) signifies unordered lists

Commercial performanceTical'' debuted at number four on the US Billboard 200 chart and number one on the US Top R&B/Hip-Hop Albums chart, becoming his first US top-ten album and his first number one on the latter. On July 13, 1995, the album was certified platinum by the Recording Industry Association of America (RIAA) for sales of over one million copies. As of October 2009, the album has 1,613,000 copies in the United States.

Track listing
All tracks produced by RZA, with tracks 7 and 9 co-produced by 4th Disciple and Method Man.

Personnel

 Method Man – performer, producer, engineer
 RZA – producer, performer, executive producer, engineer
 Streetlife – performer
 Lounge Lo - Performer
 Raekwon – performer
 Inspectah Deck – performer
 Carlton Fisk – performer
 Blue Raspberry – vocals
 Booster – vocal
 4th Disciple – producer
 David Sealy – engineer, assistant engineer, mixing, mixing assistant

 J. Nicholas – engineer, assistant engineer, mixing assistant
 Rich Keller – engineer, mixing, mixing engineer
 John Wydrycs – engineer, mixing
 Ken 'Duro' Ifill – engineer, assistant engineer
 Jack Hersca – engineer
 Ethan Royman – engineer
 Kevin Thomas – engineer
 Tony Dawsey – mastering
 Jeff Trotter – A&R Executive / mastering 
 Shawn Kilmurray – production coordination
 Chicu Modu – photography
 Drawing Board – design

Charts

Weekly charts

Year-end charts

Certifications

See also
 List of number-one R&B albums of 1994 (U.S.)

References

External links
 Tical at Discogs
 

1994 debut albums
Method Man albums
Def Jam Recordings albums
Cannabis music
Wu-Tang Clan
Albums produced by 4th Disciple
Albums produced by RZA
Albums recorded at Chung King Studios